Pechan is a surname. Notable people with the surname include:

Albert Pechan (1902–1969), American politician
Karel Pechan (1901–?), Czech cyclist